Roderick Thomas Smylie (September 28, 1895 — March 4, 1985) was a Canadian ice hockey player. Smylie played six seasons in the National Hockey League for the Toronto St. Patricks and Ottawa Senators. He won the Stanley Cup in 1922 with Toronto. He was the last surviving member of the 1921–22 Stanley Cup championship team.

Playing career
Smylie was born in Toronto. In 1915–16, Smylie played junior hockey for the Toronto R & AA team. In 1916, he enrolled in the University of Toronto and joined the U of T Dental College senior team. He played four seasons with the Dentals, including an Allan Cup series in 1917. In 1920, Smylie started his professional career with the Toronto St. Patricks. Smylie played three seasons with the St. Pats, including the 1922 Stanley Cup championship. In 1923–24, Smylie played one season for the Ottawa Senators, before returning to Toronto for two more seasons with the St. Pats before retiring from ice hockey.

Personal life
After his hockey career he became a physician and practiced at St. Michael's Hospital in Toronto.  His sons Rod and Doug both played professional football for the Toronto Argonauts and won the Grey Cup in 1952.

Career statistics

Regular season and playoffs

References

External links
 
 

1895 births
1985 deaths
Canadian ice hockey left wingers
Physicians from Ontario
Ontario Hockey Association Senior A League (1890–1979) players
Ottawa Senators (1917) players
Ice hockey people from Toronto
Stanley Cup champions
Toronto St. Pats players